The self-titled box set of American deathrock band Samhain was released in 2000, more than 13 years after the band effectively ceased recording and performing. The set's five CDs and one VHS tape compile nearly all of the band's original catalog, newly remastered from the original master tapes, as well as previously unreleased material, the latter of which includes a live CD and a VHS video cassette of live footage.

Of Samhain's previous official releases, only the original mix of the Unholy Passion EP was not included in the boxed set; conjecture is that the original master tapes had been lost over the years, or were erased when Danzig re-recorded the guitar and some vocal tracks to those songs in June 1987 for eventual release as side B of the original Final Descent.

Special packaging 
The outer box cover was painted by Martin Emond, who had previously provided artwork for singer Glenn Danzig's post-Samhain band, Danzig, and comic book company Verotik. Within the box, each of the five CDs came in its own "mini-LP" sleeve (unlike the jewel-cases used for the individual CD reissues the following year). Also included was a 32-page booklet of photographs and reprinted lyrics to Discs One and Three.

The boxed set was advertised as "a $75 value, all for just $59.95", and is now out of print. If pre-ordered online through distributor E-Magine Music's website, the first pressing of the boxed set was shipped two weeks prior to the street date, with the first 1,000 packaged with an "internet exclusive" bonus metal pin of the "scarecrow beast" character that appeared on Samhain T-shirts in the 1980s (similar to the one on the cover of the November-Coming-Fire album).

Second pressings of the boxed set omitted the bonus pin, but included "the previously unreleased Samhain comic book" by Mr. Monster creator Michael T. Gilbert (with four uncredited pages by Sean Wyett, who also illustrated Danzig for the back cover of the Misfits' Legacy of Brutality). The "contents" listing on the back of the box was modified to reflect the comic's inclusion. Some boxed sets were reportedly shipped with both the bonus metal pin and the comic.

Track listing 

 Tracks 1–10: Live February 19, 1985, at Danceteria, New York, NY
 Tracks 11–18: Live April 13, 1986, at the Cabaret Metro, Chicago, IL

 Tracks 1–8 recorded April 13, 1985, at Typographer's Hall, Baltimore, MD
 Tracks 9–13 recorded April 13, 1986, at the Cabaret Metro, Chicago, IL
 Tracks 14–16 recorded July 14, 1986, at The Ritz, New York, NY

Notes 
 Disc two marks the first time the remixed Unholy Passion EP was presented as a single CD on its own, though the contents had been added to the first CD pressing of Initium in 1987, and again to the original Final Descent in 1990. The original mix of the EP has never been released on CD, apart from unofficial/illegal bootlegs which are sourced from vinyl and cassette.
 Eerie Von has confirmed that "Death... in Its Arms" was recorded during the sessions for Danzig's second album, Danzig II: Lucifuge, and features the full original Danzig lineup: Glenn Danzig, Eerie Von, John Christ, and Chuck Biscuits.
 The title of "Death... in Its Arms" is misspelled on all releases (with an incorrect apostrophe in "it's").
 "Lords of the Left Hand (2nd Version)" was actually recorded in September 1986, while the "original version" was not recorded until September 1987, and was not mixed in its final form until 1990.
 Tracks 4 and 5 of Samhain III: November-Coming-Fire are incorrectly reversed on the CD sleeve. The correct order is listed above.
 Tracks 7 and 9 of Final Descent are incorrectly reversed on the CD sleeve. The correct order is listed above.

References 

Samhain (band) albums
Albums produced by Glenn Danzig
2000 compilation albums